Nanripo is a village in Ancuabe District in Cabo Delgado Province in northeastern Mozambique.

It lies on the highway southwest of Ancuabe.

References

External links 
Satellite map at Maplandia.com 

Populated places in Ancuabe District